Vietteilus vigens is a moth of the family Pterophoridae that is known from South Africa.

References

Endemic moths of South Africa
Pterophorinae
Moths described in 1875
Moths of Africa